Graeme Milbourne Clark AC (born 16 August 1935) is an  Australian Professor of Otolaryngology at the University of Melbourne. His work in ENT surgery, electronics and speech science contributed towards the development of the multiple-channel cochlear implant. His invention was later produced and sold by Cochlear Limited.

Early life and education
Clark was born in Camden, New South Wales, to parents Colin and Dorothy Clark. He has one younger sister. Clark was educated at The Scots College and studied medicine at Sydney University.

He specialized in ear, nose and throat surgery at the Royal National Throat, Nose and Ear Hospital and obtained a fellowship in 1964 from the Royal College of Surgeons, London. Clark returned to Australia where he became a Fellow of the Royal Australian College of Surgeons and in 1969 completed his PhD at the University of Sydney on "Middle Ear & Neural Mechanisms in Hearing and in the Management of Deafness". At the same time, he completed a Master of Surgery thesis on "The Principles of the Structural Support of the Nose and its Application to Nasal and Septal Surgery".

In 1976, he returned to England to study at the University of Keele and learn more about speech science.

Career

Development of multi-channel cochlear implants
Clark hypothesized that hearing, particularly for speech, might be reproduced in people with deafness if the damaged or underdeveloped ear were bypassed, and the auditory nerve electrically stimulated to reproduce the coding of sound. His initial doctoral research at the University of Sydney investigated the effect of the rate of electrical stimulation on single cells and groups of cells in the auditory brain-stem response, the center where frequency discrimination is first decoded.

Clark's research demonstrated that an electrode bundle with 'graded stiffness' would pass without injury around the tightening spiral of the cochlea to the speech frequency region. Until this time he had difficulty identifying a way to place the electrode bundle in the cochlea without causing any damage. He achieved a breakthrough during a vacation at the beach; he conceptualized using a seashell to replicate the human cochlea, and grass blades (which were flexible at the tip and gradually increasing in stiffness) to represent the electrodes.

Clark showed that the electrode bundle had to be free-fitting, and the wires needed to be terminated with circumferential bands to reduce friction against the outer wall of the cochlea; as to make it easier to pass the required distance. The bands had to be wide enough to minimize the charge density of the electric current for safety, but narrow enough for localized stimulation of the nerve fibers for the place coding of frequency. In order to address issues about the safety of the device, Clark conducted experiments to show that there was minimal risk of meningitis from a middle ear infection if a fibrous tissue sheath grew around the electrode bundle.  The sheath was developed from a connective tissue graft from the person's own body that was placed around the electrode bundle where it entered the cochlea.

The first cochlear implant was invented and developed by Dr. William F. House. House's device was a single electrode configuration, compared to the multiple electrode device developed by Clark.

Clark's first multi-channel cochlear implant operation was done at the Royal Victorian Eye and Ear Hospital in 1978 by Clark and Dr. Brian Pyman. The first person to receive the implant was Rod Saunders who had lost his hearing aged 46. Less than one year later, a second patient was implanted.  George Watson, an Australian World War II veteran, had lost his hearing after a bomb blast thirteen years earlier. An audiologist working on Clark's team at the time described the team's first two patients as, "guys who'd put up with anything and continue to keep coming in and support the work.".

After successfully completing the surgery in 1978, with his post-doctoral colleague, Yit Chow Tong, Clark discovered how multi-channel electrical stimulation of the brain could reproduce frequency and intensity as pitch and loudness in severely-to-profoundly deaf adults who originally had hearing before going deaf.  Electrical stimulation at low rates (50 pulses/sec) was perceived as a pitch of the same frequency, but at rates above 200 pulses/sec, what was heard was poorly discriminated and a much higher pitch. This discovery established that the timing of electrical stimuli was important for low pitch when this had been difficult to determine with sound. But discrimination of pitch up to 4000 Hz is required for speech understanding, so Clark emphasized early in the development of his cochlear implant that "place coding through multi-channel stimulation" would have to be used for the important mid-to-high speech frequencies. Clark and Tong next discovered that place of stimulation was experienced as timbre, but without a strong pitch sensation. The patient could identify separate sensations according to the site of stimulation in the cochlea.

At the end of 1978, Clark and Tong made the discovery that the speech processing strategy coded the second formant as place of stimulation along the cochlear array, the amplitude of the second formant as current level, and the voicing frequency as pulse rate across the formant channels.

in December 1978, Clark arranged that his audiologist present open-set words to his first patient, who was able to identify several correctly.

As a result, Clark went on to operate on a second patient who had been deaf for 17 years. He was able to show that the speech coding strategy was not unique to one person's brain response patterns, and that the memory for speech sounds could persist for many years after the person became deaf.

In 1982 Clark supervised the initial clinical studies mandated by the Food and Drug Administration (FDA) and in 1985, after a world trial, the FDA granted approval for his multi-channel cochlear implant for adults 18 and over who had hearing before going deaf. It thus became the first multi-channel cochlear system to be approved as safe and effective by any health regulatory body for giving speech understanding, both with lip reading and for electrical stimulation alone in people who had hearing before going deaf. After a detailed analysis of results the FDA announced in 1990 that the 22-channel cochlear implant was safe and effective for deaf children from two to 17 years of age in understanding speech both with and without lip-reading.

From 1985 to 1990 Clark and the members of his Cochlear Implant Clinic at the Eye and Ear Hospital in Melbourne, followed by other clinics worldwide, found that the formant extraction speech coding strategies developed by Clark and team resulted in up to 60% of children being able to understand significant numbers of words and sentences with electrical stimulation alone without help from lipreading. With a strategy that also extracted a band of high frequencies there were increased numbers of children with improved speech perception, speech production and language scores.

The Bionic Ear Institute

In 1970 Clark was appointed as the Foundation Professor of Otolaryngology (Ear, Nose, and Throat Surgery) at the University of Melbourne, and then in 2000 he was made one of the first Laureate Professors at the University for his international recognition of scientific achievement. He held this position until he retired in 2004.  He led cochlear implant research while Head of the Department of Otolaryngology. His research was funded initially by an appeal through a Telethon, and then a Public Interest Grant from the Australian government. His ongoing research to understand the functioning and improve the cochlear implant was through his grants from the National Health and Medical Research Council of Australia, the Australian Research Council, The US National Institutes of Health, and The Cooperative Research Center program.  In 1983 the Bionic Ear Institute was founded by Clark, as an independent, non-profit, medical research organization. The goal of the Bionic Ear Institute was, "to give deaf children and adults the opportunity to participate as fully as possible in the hearing world and to find new ways to restore brain function". The Bionic Ear Institute renamed itself the Bionics Institute in 2011 due to an expansion of its aims to not just improve the bionic ear, but to develop a bionic eye and devices capable of deep brain stimulation.

Charity foundations
In 2002 The Graeme Clark Cochlear Scholarship Foundation was established in honor of Graeme Clark for his lifelong commitment to finding a solution for people with hearing loss, and his pioneering work in the field of cochlear implant technology. Awarded by Cochlear Limited, scholarships are presented to cochlear implant recipients around the world to help defray the costs of their higher education, consisting of financial assistance towards a college degree at an accredited university for up to four years.

In recognition of Clark's contributions to the welfare of deaf people, The Graeme Clark Charitable Foundation, a charitable foundation has been established to firstly enable individuals with deafness and other sensory disorders develop their potential through appropriate biomedical, technological and educational measures.

Selected honors
 2018: Shambaugh Prize (awarded jointly with Ingeborg Hochmair and Claude-Henri Chouard)
2015: Russ Prize
 2013: The Lasker-DeBakey award (awarded jointly with Ingeborg Hochmair and Blake Wilson)
 2011: Florey Medal
 2010: Lister Medal
 2010: Doctor Honoris Causa, University of Zaragoza, Spain
 2007: Australian Father of the Year award
 2005: National Australia Day Council, Australian Achiever's Award
 2004: Fellow of the Royal Society
 2004: Prime Minister's Prize for Science
 2001: Senior Australian of the Year
 1999: Companion of the Order of Australia (AC)
1997 Sir William Upjohn Medal from the University of Melbourne
1993: Clunies Ross National Science and Technology Award
 1992: James Cook Medal
1983: Officer of the Order of Australia

Academic
 2004: Fellow of the Royal Society of London
 2003: Honorary Fellow, The Royal Society of Medicine, Nelson Kingy, London
 1998: Fellow of the Australian Academy of Science

Personal named distinctions
 2008: The Graeme Clark Centre for "Innovation in the Sciences" at The Scots College, (a leading secondary school), Sydney
 2008: The Graeme Clark Foundation, (The Graeme Clark Foundation was established to help disadvantaged people with sensory disorders develop their true potential. It also aims to give opportunities to talented scientists to develop their research to restore vital senses).
 2008: The Inaugural Graeme Clark Research Outcomes Forum. (the Australian Research Council’s Forum highlights the ways in which quality research can translate into important benefits for the community).  The Inaugural Keynote address was given by Graeme Clark.
 2008: The Graeme Clark Annual Oration, for Australia's Information and Communications Technology (ICT) Research Centre of Excellence for Life Sciences, The Inaugural Oration was given by Graeme Clark
 2003-04: The Graeme Clark Cochlear Implant Workshop for Japanese Surgeons organised by the Cooperative Research Centre for Cochlear Implant and Hearing Aid Innovation
2002	The Graeme Clark Cochlear Scholarship, awarded annually, was established in Australia and the United States to assist people with cochlear implants to undertake tertiary studies.
2002	The Graeme Clark Room, the Ear Foundation, Nottingham, UK

Academic leadership
1984-2005	Founder and Director, The Bionic Ear Institute, East Melbourne, Australia
1970-2004	Foundation Professor of Otolaryngology and Chairman, Department of Otolaryngology, The University of Melbourne, Australia
1988-1996	Director, The Australian Research Council’s Special Research Center the Human Communication Research Center, East Melbourne, Australia

Portraiture 
Clark has been painted by Peter Wegner, three of these works are in the National Portrait Gallery (Australia), as an etching, profile, and portrait.

Selected bibliography

Books
Clark GM. (2003) Cochlear Implants: Fundamentals and Applications. Springer-Verlag, New York. (The first textbook on the cochlear implant, a major 800-page work written solely by Clark)
Clark GM. (2000) Sounds from Silence. Allen & Unwin, Sydney. (Clark’s Autobiography)
Clark, Graeme M. and Cowan, Robert S.C., International Cochlear Implant Speech and Hearing Symposium : Melbourne 1994 (St Louis, Mo: Annals Publishing Company, 1995), 468 pp.
Clark, G. M., in collaboration with Blamey, P. J. [et al.], The University of Melbourne-nucleus multi-electrode cochlear implant (New York: Karger Basel, 1987). 
Clark GM. (1979) Science and God : Reconciling Science with The Christian Faith. Anzea Books, Sydney. .  ( Much is a vigorous debunk, by CLARK, of Evolution, esp. Chapter.3).

See also
 Cochlear Limited
 Bionics Institute

References

External links
 The University of Melbourne Find an Expert (Graeme Clark): http://www.findanexpert.unimelb.edu.au/researcher/person15904.html
  National Library ASAP entry: http://www.asap.unimelb.edu.au/bsparcs/archives/P001420a.htm
 National Library Graeme Clark papers: http://www.nla.gov.au/ms/findaids/8696list.html

1935 births
Alumni of Keele University
Australian otolaryngologists
Companions of the Order of Australia
Australian Fellows of the Royal Society
Living people
People educated at Sydney Boys High School
People educated at Scots College (Sydney)
University of Sydney alumni
Fellows of the Australian Academy of Technological Sciences and Engineering
Fellows of the Australian Academy of Science
Australian Christians
Recipients of the Lasker-DeBakey Clinical Medical Research Award